Yacine Qasmi (born 3 January 1991) is a professional footballer who plays as a striker for Spanish club CD Leganés. Born in France, he represented Morocco at youth international level.

After one substitute appearance for Paris Saint-Germain, he spent most of his career in Spain, primarily in Segunda División B. He later played for Elche and Rayo Vallecano in Segunda División, and the latter in La Liga.

Club career
Born in Pontoise, Qasmi joined Paris Saint-Germain's youth setup in 1999, from Cosmo de Taverny. After appearing as a senior with the reserves, he made his professional debut on 15 December 2010, coming on as a second-half substitute for Mathieu Bodmer in a 1–1 UEFA Europa League away draw against FC Karpaty Lviv.

On 6 July 2011, Qasmi signed a one-year deal with another reserve team, Rennes II. In the 2012 summer, he went on a trial at S.L. Benfica, initially appearing for the B-team; however, nothing came of it and he signed a 1+2 contract with Getafe CF, being assigned to the reserves in Segunda División B.

Qasmi subsequently resumed his career in Spain and its third tier, representing Sporting de Gijón B, Sestao River Club, SD Compostela, CD Alcoyano, Mérida AD and UD Melilla.

On 6 February 2019, Qasmi signed for Elche CF in Segunda División, as the club paid his €300,000 release clause. He made his professional league debut three days later in a 2–1 home loss to Real Oviedo, as a 78th-minute substitute for Benjamín Martínez; on 24 February he scored his first goal in such a competition, in a 2–2 draw at CD Lugo.

On 31 January 2020, Qasmi agreed to a two-and-a-half-year contract with Rayo Vallecano still in the second division. Aged 30 on 22 August the following year, he made his La Liga bow at the end of a 1–0 loss at Real Sociedad.

On 28 January 2022, after just one league appearance during the campaign, Qasmi terminated his contract with Rayo, and agreed to a 18-month deal with second division side CD Leganés the following day.

International career
Born in France, Qasmi appeared for Morocco under-20 team in a friendly match against Burkina Faso in July 2010.

Career statistics

Club

References

External links
 
 
 
 

1991 births
Living people
Sportspeople from Pontoise
French sportspeople of Moroccan descent
French footballers
Moroccan footballers
Association football forwards
Paris Saint-Germain F.C. players
Stade Rennais F.C. players
La Liga players
Segunda División players
Segunda División B players
Getafe CF B players
Sporting de Gijón B players
Sestao River footballers
SD Compostela footballers
CD Alcoyano footballers
Mérida AD players
UD Melilla footballers
Elche CF players
Rayo Vallecano players
CD Leganés players
Morocco youth international footballers
2011 CAF U-23 Championship players
French expatriate footballers
Moroccan expatriate footballers
French expatriate sportspeople in Spain
Moroccan expatriate sportspeople in Spain
Expatriate footballers in Spain
Footballers from Val-d'Oise